Raphia taedigera is a palm species in the family Arecaceae, colloquially known as yolilla in Central American Spanish. It is found in parts of Western Africa, Central America and South America.

References

taedigera
Trees of Costa Rica
Flora of Cameroon
Trees of Brazil